The 1975 UK & Ireland Greyhound Racing Year was the 49th year of greyhound racing in the United Kingdom and Ireland.

Roll of honour

Summary
The National Greyhound Racing Club officially went metric from 1 January, which would mean all races being measured over metres instead of yards. The Irish authorities decided not to adopt the new system. The annual (NGRC) returns were released, with totalisator turnover at £69,220,977 and attendances recorded at 6,200,118, representing an increase in both.

Pineapple Grand, a fawn bitch trained by Frank Baldwin was voted Greyhound of the Year after winning the Wembley Spring Cup, Laurels at Wimbledon Stadium and Oaks at Harringay Stadium. Tartan Khan was unlucky not to get the vote after winning the 1975 English Greyhound Derby and the St Leger at Wembley.

The GRA Property Trust shares were suspended as it was revealed that the company had debts near to £20 million. The future of the company looked bleak.

Tracks
Allied presentations re-opened a new Reading track at Bennett Road, just over one year after the Greyhound Racing Association had closed the venue at Oxford Road.  The new venue was built by owner trainer Bill Dore. Three independent tracks also opened at the Loomer Road Stadium in Chesterton at the Horton Road Stadium and at the Queens Park Football Ground (Bedford). Yarmouth Stadium made their debut under NGRC rules by virtue of the permit scheme. 

Oxford Stadium Managing Director Ian Stevens (son of Con Stevens), acting for Bristol Stadium Ltd, sold Oxford to the City Council housing committee for £235,000 in October. A 27,000 strong petition was lodged with the local authorities and Tory MP Michael Heseltine called for a public meeting with a deadline set to find a new buyer. Shawfield Stadium suffered a devastating fire, destroying most of the facilities. Hull Kingston Rovers bought the Craven Park stadium back from the owners; they had previously sold it in 1938.

News
Brighton trainer Fred Lugg retired and was replaced by Doreen Walsh, the head kennelhand to George Curtis. Tom Baldwin died aged 77 and John Sherry gained a position as a trainer at Walthamstow Stadium after serving his apprenticeship at the kennels of Wembley trainer Tom Johnston. 

Drynham Star broke the Derby Stadium track record over 590 metres in a re-run, despite already having run to the third bend before the hare broke down. Ramsgate trainer Peter Rich, former head man to John Coleman won all eight races at one meeting at his home track producing a 428,793-1 accumulator.

Competitions
Harringay introduced the Golden Jacket, a new event for stayers.

Ireland
Peruvian Style, a light brindle 1973 whelp owned by Deirdre Hynes and trained by Tony Fahy had been beaten in the 1,000 Guineas final by Lively Band at Dundalk. Following this he went on to win the Tipperary Cup, made the semi-finals of the Laurels, won the Harp Lager Stakes at Dundalk and the Waterford Glass Stakes breaking the track record. Twelve consecutive wins were achieved after a Shelbourne Park event win before a winter rest.

The Ger McKenna trained Ballybeg Prim was voted Irish Greyhound of the Year after winning the Irish Cesarewitch, Irish St Leger and the Shelbourne 600.

Principal UK races

+Track Record

	

+Track Record

Totalisator returns

The totalisator returns declared to the licensing authorities for the year 1975 are listed below.

References 

Greyhound racing in the United Kingdom
Greyhound racing in the Republic of Ireland
UK and Ireland Greyhound Racing Year
UK and Ireland Greyhound Racing Year
UK and Ireland Greyhound Racing Year
UK and Ireland Greyhound Racing Year